Kyoto Gyoen National Garden is a national garden of Japan. It is situated around the Kyoto Imperial Palace.

See also
 Itsukushima Shrine (Kyoto)
 Shirakumo Shrine

External links
 
 Kyoto Gyoen National Garden at Ministry of the Environment Government of Japan

Gardens in Kyoto Prefecture
Tourist attractions in Kyoto